Fr. Robert Faricy, S.J. (August 29, 1926 – March 4, 2022)  was a Jesuit priest and theologian who was an Emeritus Professor of Spirituality and lived in Milwaukee, Wisconsin. He was an Emeritus Professor of Spirituality at the Pontifical Gregorian University in Rome.

Work
The subjects of Faricy's teaching and writing include theology, philosophy, general spirituality, comparative spirituality, ecotheology, contemplative prayer, spiritual discernment, and the writings of Pierre Teilhard de Chardin, Thomas Aquinas, Thomas Merton, and Flannery O'Connor. He has also written extensively on Marian apparitions, especially at Medjugorje in Bosnia Herzegovina. He has written over thirty books, most of them originally in English and most translated into several languages, as well as several hundred articles in journals, magazines, encyclopedias, and dictionaries of theology and of spirituality. 
 
Faricy has given talks and conducted spiritual retreats in Italy, the United States, Mexico, Ireland, and many other countries, speaking at conferences and conventions and in churches. He has been active in the Catholic Charismatic Renewal, acting as Spiritual Director of the Italian Charismatic Renewal for its first eleven years, and in the renewal of the religious life for Catholic priests, brothers, and sisters. He has been a program innovator and speaker for the Catholic cable television network EWTN and president of Southern California Renewal Communities (SCRC).

Faricy died on March 4, 2022, in Wauwatosa, Wisconsin.

See also 
Society of Jesus

Books authored
Teilhard de Chardin's Theology of the Christian in the World, 1967
Praying for Inner Healing, 1979, 
The Spirituality of Teilhard de Chardin, Robert Faricy, 1981, 
The End of the Religious Life, Robert Faricy, 1983, 
Contemplating Jesus, Robert Faricy and R. Wicks, 1986, 
The Contemplative Way of Prayer: Deepening Your Life With God, Robert Faricy and Lucy Rooney  S. N. D., 1986,    
Seeking Jesus in Contemplation and Discernment, Robert L. Faricy and Michael Scanlon, 1987, 
The Lord's Dealing: The Primacy of the Feminine in Christian Spirituality, Robert L. Faricy, 1988, 
Wind and Sea Obey Him: Approaches to a Theology of Nature, Robert Faricy and Mary E. Jegen, 1988, 
A Medjugorje Retreat, Robert L. Faricy and Lucy Rooney, 1989, 
Your Wounds I Will Heal, Robert Faricy and Lucy Rooney, 1999, 
The Healing of the Religious Life, Robert Faricy and Scholastica Blackborow, 1991, 
Our Lady Comes to Scottsdale: Is It Authentic?, Robert Faricy and Lucy Rooney, 1993 and 2000, 
Return to God: The Scottsdale Message, Robert Faricy and Lucy Rooney, 1993, 
Knowing Jesus In The World, Robert Faricy and Lucy Rooney, 1996 
Lord Jesus, Teach Me to Pray: A Seven Week Course in Personal Prayer, Robert Faricy and Lucy Rooney, 1997, 
 Prayer Power: Secrets of Healing and Protection, Janice T. Connell and Robert Faricy, 1998, 
Praying With Mary: Contemplating Scripture at Her Side, Robert Faricy and Lucy Rooney, 2002, 
Full of Grace: Miraculous Stories of Healing and Conversion Through Mary's Intercession, Christine Watkins and Robert Faricy, 2010, 
Praying, Robert Faricy, 2012,

References

External links 
 RobertFaricy.org – the official web page of Robert Faricy
http://www.marquette.edu/jesres/members.shtml

1926 births
2022 deaths
20th-century American Jesuits
21st-century American Jesuits
American Roman Catholic religious writers
Ecotheology
Academic staff of the Pontifical Gregorian University
American expatriates in Italy
People from Milwaukee